Elbow Peak is a peak in Antarctica,  high, located at the southernmost bend of the Berquist Ridge in the Neptune Range of the Pensacola Mountains, Antarctica. It was mapped by the United States Geological Survey from surveys and U.S. Navy air photos, 1956–66. The name given by the Advisory Committee on Antarctic Names describes the peak's position along the ridge.

References 

Mountains of Queen Elizabeth Land
Pensacola Mountains